The Military ranks of Djibouti are the military insignia used by the Djibouti Armed Forces.

Commissioned officer ranks
The rank insignia of commissioned officers.

Other ranks
The rank insignia of non-commissioned officers and enlisted personnel.

References

External links
 

Military of Djibouti
Djibouti